Ouratea tumacoensis is a species of plant in the family Ochnaceae. It is endemic to Colombia.

References

tumacoensis
Endemic flora of Colombia
Vulnerable flora of South America
Taxonomy articles created by Polbot